Akole taluka is a taluka in Ahmednagar district in Maharashtra State of India. Akole consists of many places like Harishchandragad, Kalsubai, Bhandardara(Wilson)Dam, Sandhan Valley, Vishramgad etc. which attract tourists. Akole is not only famous for natural scenarios but, many historical events are associated with Akole Taluka too. The Western Akole is a part of Sahyadri ranges which increase its important.

Area
The table below shows area of the taluka by land type.

villages
There are around 191 villages in Akole taluka. For list of villages see Villages in Akole taluka.villages koltembe

Population
The table below shows population  of the taluka by sex. The data is as per 2001 census.

Rain Fall
The Table below details of rainfall from year 1981 to 2004.

Notable people
Indurikar Maharaj - comedian kirtankar, and social educator

See also
 Talukas in Ahmednagar district
 Villages in Akole taluka

References

Cities and towns in Ahmednagar district
Talukas in Ahmednagar district
Talukas in Maharashtra